Fethard-on-Sea or Fethard is a village in southwest County Wexford in Ireland. It lies on the R734 road on the eastern side of the Hook peninsula, between Waterford Harbour and Bannow Bay.

The village had a population of 311 as of the 2016 census. It lies in the Fethard electoral district in the Wexford constituency. It is in the Templetown parish in the Roman Catholic Diocese of Ferns. Its main industries are fishing and tourism.

Public transport
Two Bus Éireann routes serve Fethard-on-Sea: route 370 to Waterford via New Ross and a Tuesday-only route 373 to Wexford via Wellingtonbridge.

History 
In the 12th century, Baginbun near Fethard was the site of Norman landings during the Norman invasion of Ireland. The remains of Norman-era earthworks and fortifications may be seen at Baginbun Bay, south of Ingard Point.

A 12th-century castle was built by Raymond le Gros, which passed to the Bishop of Ferns and was used as an episcopal residence. There is little evidence of the castle today.

Alexander Devereux, the 16th-century bishop of Ferns and Abbot of Dunbrody, is buried in St. Mogue's Church of Ireland church.

Fethard was granted a charter by James I of England, and became a municipal borough, sending two members to the Irish parliament, before its dissolution. In 1798, a harbour, was built and this was a landing site for French troops during the revolutionary wars.

Village name
Long known simply as 'Fethard', the village became known as Fethard-on-Sea following events in 1914 when the lifeboat Helen Blake capsized. Nine of the lifeboat's fourteen-man crew were drowned during a service mission to the schooner Mexico off the Keeragh Islands. There was an outpouring of sympathy for the village and charitable donations were posted from around the world. To avoid this post from being misdirected to Fethard in County Tipperary, the name of the Fethard in County Wexford was reputedly changed to better distinguish the two.

Local businesses
There are three public houses in the village, a grocery shop and a number of cafes, B&B and a hotel that was refurbished and reopened in 2019. Local tourist attractions include Hook Head Lighthouse and Loftus Hall, further afield on the Hook Peninsula.

Fethard-on-Sea boycott 

In May 1957, Roman Catholic villagers ("incited by the local curate") boycotted Protestant-owned local businesses in response to the actions of a Protestant woman, Sheila Cloney, who had left her Catholic husband and the village, to avoid being obliged to send her children to the local Catholic school. The boycott received national and international attention before it concluded. The family was reconciled, with the daughters being home-schooled.

A film was made about the Cloney family and boycott. Released in 1999, A Love Divided starred Orla Brady and Liam Cunningham. A review of the film by the American Catholic League organisation questioned the film's depiction of the Catholic Church in Ireland.

See also 
 Hook Head
 List of RNLI stations
 List of towns and villages in Ireland
 Mervyn A. Ellison

References 

Towns and villages in County Wexford
Roman Catholic Diocese of Ferns